A tampon is a menstrual  product designed to absorb blood and vaginal secretions by insertion into the vagina during menstruation. Unlike a pad, it is placed internally, inside of the vaginal canal. Once inserted correctly, a tampon is held in place by the vagina and expands as it soaks up menstrual blood. However, in addition to menstrual blood, the tampon also absorbs the vagina's natural lubrication and bacteria, which can change the normal pH, increasing the risk of infections from the bacterium Staphylococcus aureus, which can lead to toxic shock syndrome (TSS). TSS is a rare but life-threatening infection that requires immediate medical attention.

The majority of tampons sold are made of rayon, or a blend of rayon and cotton, along with synthetic fibers. Some tampons are made out of organic cotton. Tampons are available in several absorbency ratings. Brands include (but are not limited to) Kotex, Playtex, Tampax (Always), O.B., Cora, Lola, Sustain, Honest Company, Seventh Generation, Solimo, and Rael Tampons.

Several countries regulate tampons as medical devices. In the United States, they are considered to be a Class II medical device by the Food and Drug Administration (FDA). They are sometimes used for hemostasis in surgery.

Design and packaging

Tampon design varies between companies and across product lines in order to offer a variety of applicators, materials and absorbencies. There are two main categories of tampons based on the way of insertion - digital tampons inserted by finger, and applicator tampons. Tampon applicators may be made of plastic or cardboard, and are similar in design to a syringe. The applicator consists of two tubes, an "outer", or barrel, and "inner", or plunger. The outer tube has a smooth surface to aid insertion and sometimes comes with a rounded end that is petaled.

Differences exist in the way tampons expand when in use: applicator tampons generally expand axially (increase in length), while digital tampons will expand radially (increase in diameter). Most tampons have a cord or string for removal. The majority of tampons sold are made of rayon, or a blend of rayon and cotton. Organic cotton tampons are made from only 100% cotton. Tampons may also come in scented or unscented varieties.

Absorbency ratings

In the US 
Tampons are available in several absorbency ratings, which are consistent across manufacturers in the U.S. These differ in the amount of cotton in each product and are measured based on the amount of fluid they are able to absorb. The absorbency rates required by the U.S. Food and Drug Administration (FDA) for manufacturer labeling are listed below:

In Europe 
Absorbency ratings outside the US may be different. The majority of non-US manufacturers use absorbency rating and Code of Practice recommended by EDANA (European Disposables and Nonwovens Association).

In the UK 
In the UK, the Absorbent Hygiene Product Manufacturers Association (AHPMA) has written a Tampon Code of Practice which companies can follow on a volunteer basis. According to this code, UK manufacturers should follow the (European) EDANA code (see above).

Testing 
A piece of test equipment referred to as a Syngyna (short for synthetic vagina) is usually used to test absorbency. The machine uses a condom into which the tampon is inserted, and synthetic menstrual fluid is fed into the test chamber.

A novel way of testing was developed by feminist medical experts after the toxic shock syndrome (TSS) crisis, and used blood  - rather than the industry standard blue saline - as a test material.

Labeling 
The FDA requires the manufacturer to perform absorbency testing to determine the absorbency rating using the Syngyna method or other methods that are approved by the FDA. The manufacturer is also required to include on the package label the absorbency rating and a comparison to other absorbency ratings as an attempt to help consumers choose the right product and avoid complications of TSS. In addition, The following statement of association between tampons and TSS is required by the FDA to be on the package label as part of the labeling requirements: "Attention: Tampons are associated with Toxic Shock Syndrome (TSS). TSS is a rare but serious disease that may cause death. Read and save the enclosed information."

Such guidelines for package labeling are more lenient when it comes to tampons bought from vending machines. For example, tampons sold in vending machines are not required by the FDA to include labeling such as absorbency ratings or information about TSS.

Costs 
The average woman may use approximately 11,400 tampons in her lifetime (if using only tampons). Generally, a box of tampons costs can range from $6 to $10 USD and has 12 to 40 tampons per box. Thus, women could use around 9 boxes a year, leading to a total cost between $54 to $90 USD a year (around $0.20-$0.40 a tampon). 
Activists call the problem some women have when not being able to afford products "period poverty".

Health aspects

Toxic shock syndrome

Menstrual toxic shock syndrome (mTSS) is a life-threatening disease most commonly caused by infection of superantigen-producing Staphylococcus aureus. The superantigen toxin secreted in S. aureus infections is TSS Toxin-1, or TSST-1. Incidence ranges from 0.03 to 0.50 cases per 100,000 people, with an overall mortality around 8%. mTSS signs and symptoms include fever (greater than or equal to 38.9 °C), rash, desquamation, hypotension (systolic blood pressure less than 90 mmHg), and multi-system organ involvement with at least three systems, such as gastrointestinal complications (vomiting), central nervous system (CNS) effects (disorientation), and myalgia.

Toxic shock syndrome was named by James K. Todd in 1978. Philip M. Tierno Jr., Director of Clinical Microbiology and Immunology at the NYU Langone Medical Center, helped determine that tampons were behind toxic shock syndrome (TSS) cases in the early 1980s. Tierno blames the introduction of higher-absorbency tampons made with rayon in 1978, as well as the relatively recent decision by manufacturers to recommend that tampons can be worn overnight, for the surge in cases of TSS. However, a later meta-analysis found that the  material composition of tampons is not directly correlated to the incidence of toxic shock syndrome, whereas oxygen and carbon dioxide content of menstrual fluid uptake is associated more strongly.

In 1982, a liability case called Kehm v. Proctor & Gamble took place, where the family of Patricia Kehm sued Procter & Gamble for her death on September 6, 1982, from TSS, while using Rely brand tampons. The case was the first successful case to sue the company. Procter & Gamble paid $300,000 in compensatory damages to the Kehm family. This case can be attributed to the increase in regulations and safety protocol testing for current FDA requirements.

Some risk factors identified for developing TSS include recent labor and delivery, tampon use, recent staphylococcus infection, recent surgery, and foreign objects inside the body.

The FDA suggests the following guidelines for decreasing the risk of contracting TSS when using tampons:
 Choose the lowest absorbency needed for one's flow (test of absorbency is approved by FDA)
 Follow package directions and guidelines for insertion and tampon usage (located on box's label)
 Change the tampon at least every 6 to 8 hours or more often if needed
 Alternate usage between tampons and pads
 Avoid tampon usage overnight or when sleeping
 Increase awareness of the warning signs of Toxic Shock Syndrome and other tampon-associated health risks (and remove the tampon as soon as a risk factor is noticed)

The FDA also advises those with a history of TSS not to use tampons and instead turn to other feminine hygiene products to control menstrual flow. Other menstrual hygiene products available include pads, menstrual cups, menstrual discs, and reusable period underwear.

Cases of tampon-connected TSS are very rare in the United Kingdom and United States. A controversial study by Tierno found that all-cotton tampons were less likely than rayon tampons to produce the conditions in which TSS can grow. This was done using a direct comparison of 20 brands of tampons, including conventional cotton/rayon tampons and 100% organic cotton tampons. In a series of studies conducted after this initial claim, it was shown that all tampons (regardless of composition) are similar in their effect on TSS and that tampons made with rayon do not have an increased incidence of TSS. Instead, tampons should be selected based on minimum absorbency rating necessary to absorb flow corresponding to the individual.

Sea sponges are also marketed as menstrual hygiene products. A 1980 study by the University of Iowa found that commercially sold sea sponges contained sand, grit, and bacteria. Hence, sea sponges could also potentially cause toxic shock syndrome.

Studies have shown non-significantly higher mean levels of mercury in tampon users compared to non tampon users. No evidence showed an association between tampon use and inflammation biomarkers.

Other considerations

Bleached products 
According to the Women's Environmental Network research briefing on menstrual products made from wood pulp:The basic ingredient for menstrual pads is wood pulp, which begins life as a brown coloured product. Various ‘purification’ processes can be used to bleach it white. Measurable levels of dioxin have been found near paper pulping mills, where chlorine has been used to bleach the wood pulp. Dioxin is one of the most persistent and toxic chemicals, and can cause reproductive disorders, damage to the immune system and cancer (26). There are no safe levels and it builds up in our fat tissue and in our environment.

Marine pollution 
In the UK, the Marine Conservation Society has researched the prevalence and problem of plastic tampon applicators found on beaches.

Disposal and flushing

Disposal of tampons, especially flushing (which manufacturers warn against) may lead to clogged drains and waste management problems.

Tampon-drug interactions 
There are multiple cases in which the use of tampons may need medical advice from a healthcare professional. For example, as part of the National Institutes of Health, the U.S. National Library of Medicine and its branch MedlinePlus advise against using tampons while being treated with any of several medications taken by the vaginal route such as vaginal suppositories and creams, as tampons may decrease the absorbance of these drugs by the body. Example of these medications include clindamycin, terconazole, miconazole, clotrimazole, when used as a vaginal cream or vaginal suppository, as well as butoconazole vaginal cream.

Increased risk for infections 
According to the American Society for Blood and Marrow Transplantation (ASBMT), tampons may be responsible for an increased risk of infection due to the erosions it causes in the tissue of the cervix and vagina, leaving the skin prone to infections. Thus, ASBMT advises hematopoietic stem-cell transplantation recipients against using tampons while undergoing therapy.

Other uses

Clinical use
Tampons are currently being used and tested to restore and/or maintain the normal microbiota of the vagina to treat bacterial vaginosis.  Some of these are available to the public but come with disclaimers. The efficacy of the use of these probiotic tampons has not been established.

Tampons have also been used in cases of tooth extraction to reduce post-extraction bleeding.

Tampons are currently being investigated as a possible use to detect endometrial cancer. Endometrial cancer does not currently have effective cancer screening methods if an individual is not showing symptoms. Tampons not only absorb menstrual blood, but also vaginal fluids. The vaginal fluids absorbed in the tampons would also contain the cancerous DNA, and possibly contain precancerous material, allowing for earlier detection of endometrial cancer.  Clinical trials are currently being conducted to evaluate the use of tampons as a screening method for early detection of endometrial cancer.

Environment and waste 

Appropriate disposal of used tampons is still lacking in many countries. Because the lack of menstrual management practices in some countries, many sanitary pads or other menstrual products will be disposed into domestic solid wastes or garbage bins that eventually becomes part of a solid wastes.

The issue that underlies the governance or implementation of menstrual waste management is how country categorizes menstrual waste. This waste could be considered as a common household waste, hazardous household waste (which will required to be segregated from routine household waste), biomedical waste given amount of blood it contains, or plastic waste given the plastic content in many commercial disposal pads (some only the outer case of the tampon or pads).

Ecological impact varies according to disposal method (whether a tampon is flushed down the toilet or placed in a garbage bin - the latter is the recommended option). Factors such as tampon composition will likewise impact sewage treatment plants or waste processing. The average use of tampons in menstruation may add up to approximately 11,400 tampons in someone's  lifetime (if they use only tampons rather than other products). Tampons are made of cotton, rayon, polyester, polyethylene, polypropylene, and fiber finishes. Aside from the cotton, rayon and fiber finishes, these materials are not biodegradable. Organic cotton tampons are biodegradable, but must be composted to ensure they break down in a reasonable amount of time. Rayon was found to be more biodegradable than cotton.

Environmentally friendly alternatives to using tampons are the menstrual cup, reusable sanitary pads, menstrual sponges, reusable tampons, and reusable absorbent underwear.

The Royal Institute of Technology in Stockholm carried out a life-cycle assessment (LCA) comparison of the environmental impact of tampons and sanitary pads. They found that the main environmental impact of the products was in fact caused by the processing of raw materials, particularly LDPE (low density polyethylene) – or the plastics used in the backing of pads and tampon applicators, and cellulose production. As production of these plastics requires a lot of energy and creates long-lasting waste, the main impact from the life cycle of these products is fossil fuel use, though the waste produced is significant in its own right.

The menstrual material was disposed according to the type of product, and even based on cultural beliefs. This was done regardless of giving any importance to the location and proper techniques of disposal. In some areas of the world, menstrual waste is disposed into pit latrines, as burning and burial were difficult due to limited private space.

History
Women have used tampons during menstruation for thousands of years. In her book Everything You Must Know About Tampons (1981), Nancy Friedman writes,[T]here is evidence of tampon use throughout history in a multitude of cultures. The oldest printed medical document, Ebers Papyrus, refers to the use of soft papyrus tampons by Egyptian women in the fifteenth century B.C. Roman women used wool tampons. Women in ancient Japan fashioned tampons out of paper, held them in place with a bandage, and changed them 10 to 12 times a day. Traditional Hawaiian women used the furry part of a native fern called hapu'u; and grasses, mosses and other plants are still used by women in parts of Asia and Africa.R. G. Mayne defined a tampon in 1860 as: "a less inelegant term for the plug, whether made up of portions of rag, sponge, or a silk handkerchief, where plugging the vagina is had recourse to in cases of hemorrhage."

Earle Haas patented the first modern tampon, Tampax, with the tube-within-a-tube applicator. Gertrude Schulte Tenderich (née Voss) bought the patent rights to her company trademark Tampax and started as a seller, manufacturer, and spokesperson in 1933. Tenderich hired women to manufacture the item and then hired two sales associates to market the product to drugstores in Colorado and Wyoming, and nurses to give public lectures on the benefits of the creation, and was also instrumental in inducing newspapers to run advertisements.

In 1945, Tampax presented a number of studies to prove the safety of tampons. A 1965 study by the Rock Reproductive Clinic stated that the use of tampons "has no physiological or clinical undesired side effects".

During her study of female anatomy, German gynecologist Judith Esser-Mittag developed a digital-style tampon, which was made to be inserted without an applicator. In the late 1940s, Carl Hahn and Heinz Mittag worked on the mass production of this tampon. Hahn sold his company to Johnson & Johnson in 1974.

In 1992, Congress found an internal FDA memo about the presence of dioxin, a known carcinogen, in tampons. Dioxin is one of the toxic chemicals produced when wood pulp is bleached with chlorine. Congressional hearings were held and tampon manufacturers assured Congress that the trace levels of dioxin in tampons was well below EPA level. The EPA has stated there is no accept level of dioxin. Following this, major commercial tampon brands began switching from dioxin-producing chlorine gas bleaching methods to either elemental “chlorine-free” or “totally chlorine free” bleaching processes.

In the United States, the Tampon Safety and Research Act was introduced to Congress in 1997 in an attempt to create transparency between tampon manufacturers and consumers. The bill would mandate the conduct or support of research on the extent to which additives in feminine hygiene products pose any risks to the health of women or to the children of women who use those products during or before the pregnancies involved. Although yet to be passed, the bill has been continually reintroduced, most recently in 2019 as the Robin Danielson Feminine Hygiene Product Safety Act. Data would also be required from manufacturers regarding the presence of dioxins, synthetic fibers, chlorine, and other components (including contaminants and substances used as fragrances, colorants, dyes, and preservatives) in their feminine hygiene products.

Society and culture

Tampon tax

"Tampon tax" refers to tampons' lack of tax exempt status that is often in place for other basic need products.  Several political statements have been made in regards to tampon use. In 2000, a 10% goods and services tax (GST) was introduced in Australia. While lubricant, condoms, incontinence pads and numerous medical items were regarded as essential and exempt from the tax, tampons continue to be charged GST. Prior to the introduction of GST, several states also applied a luxury tax to tampons at a higher rate than GST. Specific petitions such as "Axe the Tampon Tax" have been created to oppose this tax, and the tax was removed in 2019.
In the UK, tampons are subject to a zero rate of value added tax (VAT), as opposed to the standard rate of 20% applied to the vast majority of products sold in the country. The UK was previously bound by the EU VAT directive, which required a minimum of 5% VAT on sanitary products. Since 1 January 2021, VAT applied to menstrual sanitary products has been 0%.

In Canada, the federal government has removed the goods and services tax (GST) and harmonized sales tax (HST) from tampons and other menstrual hygiene products as of July 1, 2015.

In the US, access to menstrual products such as pads and tampons and taxes added on these products, have also been controversial topics especially when it comes to people with low income. Laws for exempting such taxes differ vastly from state to state. The American Civil Liberties Union (ACLU) has published a report discussing these laws and listing the different guidelines followed by institutions such as schools, shelters, and prisons when providing menstrual goods.

The report by ACLU also discusses the case of Kimberly Haven who was a former prisoner that had a hysterectomy after she had experienced toxic shock syndrome (TSS) due to using handmade tampons from toilet paper in prison. Her testimony supported a Maryland bill that is intended to increase access of menstrual products for imprisoned women.

Etymology 
Historically, the word "tampon" originated from the medieval French word "tampion", meaning a piece of cloth to stop a hole, a stamp, plug, or stopper.

Virginity 
Tampon use may stretch or break the hymen of individuals that have never been sexually active. Some cultures regard preservation of the hymen as a supposed evidence of virginity, which may discourage some people from using tampons.

In popular culture 
In Stephen King's novel Carrie, the title character is bullied for menstruating and is bombarded with tampons and pads by her peers.

In 1985, Tampon Applicator Creative Klubs International (TACKI) was established to develop creative uses for discarded, non-biodegradable, plastic feminine hygiene products, commonly referred to as “beach whistles”. TACKI President Jay Critchley launched his corporation in order to develop a global folk art movement and cottage industry, promote awareness of these throwaway objects washed up on beaches worldwide from faulty sewage systems, create the world's largest collection of discarded plastic tampon applicators, and ban their manufacture and sale through legislative action. The project and artwork was carried out during numerous site-specific performances and installations.

See also
 Cloth menstrual pad
 Menstrual cup
 Sanitary napkin
 Tamponade
 Menstruation and culture

References

External links

 Myths About Tampons (web article)
 Original patent by Earle Haas
 Tampon Related Patents (archived)
Can Tampons Cause a UTI by TamponsAndMenstrualCups.com

Feminine hygiene
Personal hygiene products
Menstrual cycle
Disposable products
Vagina